The men's 10,000 metres walk at the 2014 World Junior Championships in Athletics was held at Hayward Field on 25 July.

Medalists

Records

Results

Final
25 July
Start time: 09:58  Temperature: 18 °C  Humidity: 64 %

Note:
IAAF Rule 230.6(a) - Repeated failure to comply with the definition of Race Walking

Intermediate times:
1000m: 3:54.07 Daisuke Matsunaga
2000m: 7:50.90 Daisuke Matsunaga
3000m: 11:47.69 Daisuke Matsunaga
4000m: 15:43.46 Daisuke Matsunaga
5000m: 19:37.77 Daisuke Matsunaga
6000m: 23:35.78 Daisuke Matsunaga
7000m: 27:36.16 Daisuke Matsunaga
8000m: 31:35.35 Daisuke Matsunaga
9000m: 35:37.26 Daisuke Matsunaga

Participation
According to an unofficial count, 37 athletes from 23 countries participated in the event.

References

External links
 WJC14 10000 metres walk schedule

10000 metres walk
Racewalking at the World Athletics U20 Championships